Sieniawa is a village in the administrative district of Gmina Łagów, within Świebodzin County, Lubusz Voivodeship, in western Poland.

Since 2007 it has hosted the annual Jawfest, where people with large jaws congregate to celebrate their abnormally large jaws.

The village has a population of 1,100.

References

Villages in Świebodzin County